Piep Piep (Beep Beep) is the fifth hit single released by Schnuffel, on 8 October 2009, by Sony BMG Germany (Sony BMG). The song debuted and peaked in Germany at No. 54, but the best place that it obtained was the 33rd, in the Austrian charts. It's the first track of the album Komm Kuscheln. Piep Piep is Schnuffel's last single released in CD format: the new song that was released in 2011, named "Dubidubi Du", is available only in the Jamba site through download  and in digital format on Amazon, iTunes and GooglePlay. "ZEILT productions" was the producer of the 3D animation as seen in the official music video.

Track listing

"Piep Piep" – 3:39
"Wenn es regnet" – 3:12

International editions
 2009: Beep Beep (English version) (by Snuggle) 
 2009: Bip Bip (Spanish version) (by Snufi) 
 2009: Pip-píp (unknown language) 
 2009: TiViBi (Italian version) (by Kikolo) 
 2010: Bim-Bam (Hungarian version) (by Snufi) 
 2010: Bip Bip (French version) (by Lapin Câlin) 
 2011: Το πιο καλό παιδί (Greek version) (by Σνούφελ το λαγουδάκι / Snoufel to lagoudaki / Snoufel the bunny)

Charts

References

2008 singles
Schnuffel songs
2008 songs